Nastja Kolar (born 15 July 1994) is a Slovenian tennis player. She was a talented junior, her highest ranking was fourth. Her highest WTA rankings are 178 in singles and 140 in doubles.

Tennis career
In July 2009, Kolar performed her first WTA Tour tournament, the Slovenia Open in Portorož, where she lost to Roberta Vinci in the first round. In 2010, she won a $10k tournament in Croatia, her first title on the ITF Women's Circuit.

In May 2011, Kolar won her second ITF title at a $25k event in Maribor, Slovenia. In July, she qualified for the Gastein Ladies where she won her first WTA Tour-level match when she defeated Alla Kudryavtseva, in straight sets, to advance to the second round.

ITF Circuit finals

Singles: 23 (10 titles, 13 runner-ups)

Doubles: 28 (15 titles, 13 runner-ups)

External links
 
 
 
 

1994 births
Slovenian female tennis players
Living people
Sportspeople from Celje